Aldemir dos Santos Ferreira (born 31 December 1997), commonly known as Ferreira, is a Brazilian professional footballer who plays for Grêmio as a forward.

Club career
Born in Dourados, Mato Grosso do Sul, Ferreira joined Grêmio's youth setup in 2014, from a football school back in his homeland. In 2016, he was loaned to São Luiz for the Campeonato Gaúcho Série A2 and made his senior debut on 13 March, starting in a 3–2 home win against Panambi.

Ferreira scored his first senior goal on 24 March 2016, netting the game's only in a home success over Caxias. After contributing with two goals during the tournament, he returned to Grêmio and was assigned to the under-20s.

On 14 December 2017, after finishing his formation, Ferreira was loaned to Toledo for the ensuing Campeonato Paranaense. Regularly used, he joined neighbouring Cianorte for the 2018 Série D, still owned by Grêmio.

On 9 January 2019, Ferreira moved to Aimoré on loan, but featured rarely due to a foot injury. He then returned to Tricolor and was assigned to the reserve team for the Campeonato Brasileiro de Aspirantes.

On 23 July 2019, Ferreira extended his contract with Grêmio until the end of 2021, and helped the reserves finish second in the Brasileirão de Aspirantes. He made his first team debut on 29 September, coming on as a second-half substitute for Luciano in a 2–1 away loss against Fluminense for the Série A championship.

Ferreira scored his first goal in the top tier on 5 December 2019, netting the opener in a 2–0 home defeat of Cruzeiro.

Career statistics

Honors
Grêmio
Campeonato Gaúcho: 2020, 2021, 2022
Recopa Gaúcha: 2021, 2022

References

External links
Grêmio official profile 

1997 births
Living people
Sportspeople from Mato Grosso do Sul
Association football forwards
Brazilian footballers
Campeonato Brasileiro Série A players
Campeonato Brasileiro Série B players
Campeonato Brasileiro Série D players
Esporte Clube São Luiz players
Toledo Esporte Clube players
Cianorte Futebol Clube players
Clube Esportivo Aimoré players
Grêmio Foot-Ball Porto Alegrense players